Agave parryi var. huachucensis, synonym Agave huachucensis, is a variety of Agave parryi subsp. parryi. It is commonly known as the Huachuca agave.

"Agave huachucensis Sarg." (the epithet is also spelt huachuaensis) is an error; Charles Sargent referred to Agave huachucensis Baker.

References

huachucensis